Sali Vongkhamsao (29 September 1925 – 23 January 1991) was a Laotian politician and member of the Lao People's Revolutionary Party (LPRP).

He became a substitute member of the LPRP Central Committee, and was elected to full membership at the 3rd National Congress and retained a seat on the body until.

References

Specific

Bibliography
Books:
 

1925 births
1991 deaths
Members of the 1st Central Committee of the Lao People's Party
Members of the 2nd Central Committee of the Lao People's Revolutionary Party
Members of the 3rd Central Committee of the Lao People's Revolutionary Party
Members of the 4th Central Committee of the Lao People's Revolutionary Party
Members of the 2nd Secretariat of the Lao People's Revolutionary Party
Members of the 3rd Secretariat of the Lao People's Revolutionary Party
Members of the 4th Secretariat of the Lao People's Revolutionary Party
Members of the 4th Politburo of the Lao People's Revolutionary Party
Deputy Prime Ministers of Laos
Finance Ministers of Laos
Government ministers of Laos
Lao People's Revolutionary Party politicians
Place of birth missing